Smiður Andrésson (died July 1361) was governor in Iceland whose reputation for brutal methods in collecting taxes lead to an attack on him at Grund in Eyjafjörður where he fell along with Jón Skráveifa and six of his men.

Year of birth missing
1361 deaths
14th-century Icelandic people